Rex Chandler (May 22, 1937 – December 17, 2014) was an American politician. He served as a Democratic member for the 5th district of the Oklahoma Senate.

Life and career 
Chandler was born in Idabel, Oklahoma, the son of Evelyn Vicksburg Mullins and Rex Arthur Chandler. He was a member of the Idabel City Council and also a member of the school board of Broken Bow, Oklahoma.

In 1989, Chandler was elected to represent the 5th district of the Oklahoma Senate, succeeding Gerald Dennis. He served until 1993, when he was succeeded by Jack Bell.

Chandler died in December 2014 at his home in Broken Bow, Oklahoma, at the age of 77.

References 

1937 births
2014 deaths
People from Idabel, Oklahoma
Democratic Party Oklahoma state senators
20th-century American politicians